The following is a list of the municipalities (comuni) of Veneto, Italy.

There are 563 municipalities in Veneto (as of January 2019):

61 in the Province of Belluno
102 in the Province of Padua
50 in the Province of Rovigo
94 in the Province of Treviso
44 in the Metropolitan City of Venice
98 in the Province of Verona
114 in the Province of Vicenza

List

See also
List of municipalities of Italy

References

 
Geography of Veneto
Veneto